This is a list of diplomatic missions in Cambodia.  At present, the capital city of Phnom Penh hosts 29 embassies and a delegation of the European Union.   Several other countries have missions accredited from other capitals, mostly in Bangkok, Beijing, Hanoi, and Seoul.

Resident missions in Phnom Penh

Embassies

Other representations
 (Embassy office)
 (Delegation)
 (Embassy office)

Consulates

Siem Reap 
 (Consular office)
 (Consular office)

Battambang

Stung Treng

Sihanoukville 
 (Consular office)

Non-resident embassies accredited to Cambodia

Resident in Bangkok, Thailand:

 
 

 
 
 
 

 

 

Resident in Beijing, China:

 

 
 
 

Resident in Hanoi, Vietnam:

 
 

Resident in Kuala Lumpur, Malaysia:

 
 

 

 

Resident in Seoul, South Korea

 

Resident elsewhere:

 (Jakarta)
 (New Delhi)
 (New York City)
 (Tokyo)
 (Vientiane)
 (Manila)
 (Jakarta)
 (Ho Chi Minh City)

Former Embassy

To open
 (Embassy)
 (Embassy)
 (Diplomatic office) 
 (Embassy)
 (Embassy) 
 (Embassy)

See also
 List of diplomatic missions of Cambodia
 Visa requirements for Cambodian citizens

References

External links
Listing of embassies

 
Cambodia
Diplomatic missions